Umm al-Khair is a Palestinian village located in the Hebron Governorate of the southern West Bank. It is inhabited by five families, roughly 70 people.

History

In 1883, the PEF's Survey of Western Palestine noted "piles of stones" at Rujm Umm Kheir. 

The Palestinian villagers settled there several decades ago, after Israel expelled them from the Arad desert, and purchased the land from residents in the Palestinian village of Yatta. 

In the wake of the 1948 War, and after the 1949 Armistice Agreements, Umm al-Khair came under Jordanian rule. 

During the Six-Day War in 1967, Umm al-Khair came under Israeli occupation. 
According to David Shulman, the nearby settlement, Carmel, lies on lands confiscated from the Bedouin of that village.

Human rights activists and reporters have criticized the lack of amenities for the villagers while settlers nearby enjoy modern life. According to Nicholas Kristof of The New York Times Carmel is 
'a lovely green oasis that looks like an American suburb. It has lush gardens, kids riding bikes and air-conditioned homes. It also has a gleaming, electrified poultry barn that it runs as a business.' Beyond its barbed wire fencing, the Bedouins of Umm al-Kheir in shanties are denied connection to the electricity grid, barns for their livestock and toilets, and all attempts to build permanent dwellings are demolished. Elad Orian, an Israeli human rights activist, noted that the chickens of Carmel's poultry farm get more electricity and water than the Palestinian Bedouin nearby. 

Hammerman writes as follows:
Right next to the stately country homes - complete with air-conditioning, drip-irrigation gardens and goldfish ponds - a few extended families including old men, old women and infants live in dwellings made of tin, cloth and plastic siding, though there are a few cinder-block structures, too. They tread on broken, barren ground. They have no running water. They are not connected to the power grid that lights up every settlement and outpost in this remote region. They have no access road.
David Dean Shulman has taken down the account of one of the villagers, a young man named ‘Id al-Hajalin, who after outlining their difficulties, showed two documents, a receipt for taxes he paid on his land, and another, an order from the Military Authorities to demolish his home. He commented:
“Why do they want to destroy my house? Where can I go? Can I go to America? I have nothing, and they want to take that nothing from me. Can you help me? Where am I supposed to go?”

Umm al-Khair was one of the main subjects of the 2016 book The Way to the Spring: Life and Death in Palestine by Ben Ehrenreich.

Umm al-Khair is also the base community for the Good Shepherd Collective, a grassroots organization resisting Israeli settler colonialism.

References

Bibliography

Further reading

External links
Articles on Ta'ayush website
Al Faqir (Umm al Kheir) Village Profile, Applied Research Institute–Jerusalem (ARIJ) 
The priorities and needs for development in Al Faqir (Umm al Kheir) village based on the community and local authorities' assessment, ARIJ
Survey of Western Palestine, map 21: IAA, Wikimedia commons 

Villages in the West Bank
Hebron Governorate
Municipalities of the State of Palestine